Lutepää is a small village on the Värska-to-Saatse gravel road in southeast Estonia.

Lutepää is one of the few villages in the European Union that can only be reached by travelling through Russia. The one and only road through Lutepää cuts, on either side of the village, through Russia's Saatse Boot area, making Lutepää a practical enclave. No Russian visa is required to drive the road to Lutepää, but those in transit by car though the territory of the Russian Federation are not permitted to stop en route.

References

External links
Lutepää, at Hidden Europe

Villages in Võru County
Estonia–Russia border crossings